The Geely Icon (stylised as ICON) is a subcompact crossover SUV produced by Chinese auto manufacturer Geely. It was introduced on 24 February 2020.

History

The car was previewed as the ICON SUV Concept at the 2018 Beijing Auto Show. The car was designed in Geely Design's studio in Shanghai under the lead of the centre's design chief, Guy Burgoyne. The Icon was launched through an online streaming platform at the height of COVID-19 pandemic in China. As a response, the car was released with an 'Intelligent Air Purification System' that was claimed as N95 certified. The feature was claimed to work in tandem with the Icon's air conditioner to isolate and eliminate harmful elements in the cabin air including bacteria and viruses.

The car is equipped with level two driver-assist features enabled by 12 ultrasonic radars, millimetre wave radar, and five cameras. It features adaptive cruise control, lane-keep assistance, autonomous emergency braking and pedestrian recognition, one-button automatic parking, and a 360-degree camera. Geely Auto received over 30,000 orders in the hours leading up to its launch through online pre-order.

Powertrain 
Fuel consumption for the mild hybrid setup is a claimed to be . The sole transmission option available is a seven-speed dual-clutch transmission. The 0-100 km/h (0-62 mph) acceleration is in 7.9 seconds.

References 

2020s cars
Cars introduced in 2020
Cars of China
Crossover sport utility vehicles
Front-wheel-drive vehicles
Geely vehicles
Mini sport utility vehicles